Michael Delisle (born 1959 in Longueuil) is a Canadian writer from Quebec. He is a two-time nominee for the Governor General's Award for French-language fiction, for Le sort de fille at the 2006 Governor General's Awards and for Le Feu de mon père at the 2014 Governor General's Awards, and won the Grand prix du livre de Montréal in 2014 for Le Feu de mon père. He also received the Prix Émile-Nelligan for Fontainebleau in 1987 and the Prix Adrienne-Choquette for Le sort de Fille in 2005.

He is a professor of literature at the Cégep du Vieux Montréal.

Works
 L'agrandissement (1980)
 Drame privé (1990)
 Helen avec un secret et autres nouvelles (1995)
English translation Helen with a Secret (tr. Gail Scott)
 Long glissement (1996)
 Le désarroi du matelot (1998)
English translation The Sailor's Disquiet (tr. Gail Scott)
 Dée (2002)
 Le sort de Fille (2005)
 Prière à blanc (2009)
 Tiroir No. 24 (2010)
 Le Feu de mon père (2014)

References

1959 births
Living people
Canadian male novelists
Canadian short story writers in French
20th-century Canadian poets
Canadian male poets
21st-century Canadian poets
20th-century Canadian novelists
21st-century Canadian novelists
Writers from Quebec
People from Longueuil
Canadian novelists in French
Canadian poets in French
Canadian male short story writers
20th-century Canadian short story writers
21st-century Canadian short story writers
20th-century Canadian male writers
21st-century Canadian male writers